Teočak Castle (English: The Fortress of Teočak) is a medieval castle located in Teočak, Bosnia and Herzegovina, on the Majevica mountain range.

History 
In the distant past Teočak played a very important role due to its geographical position on the mountain range Majevica where fortress was strategically located. Prominent settlements of Drina and Sava, Bijeljina and Brcko and many other of Semberija area can be seen from it. The remains of a fortress are in town Stari Teočak next to modern town Teočak. Below the fortress on the same hill is a mosque built during rule of Sultan Mehmed II the Conqueror, who captured the fortress from the Kingdom of Hungary in early 1474. The population around Teočak used to be Christian and some of the Hungarian and Roman churches and monasteries have been preserved in Teočak. In Teočak there were two necropolises of stećak tombstones Mramor and Harci, some of the stećak tombstones have been preserved to this day.

During the Middle Ages, these areas were frequently conquered than lost and conquered again by  Hungarian kings, Serbian despots and Bosnian rulers. When area of the parish of Soli (Tuzla)  was first mentioned in the Middle Ages, it was part of Kingdom of Serbia. It was held by the Serbian king Stefan Dragutin from 1284, and he was succeeded by his sons: Vladislav and Uroš. The Rus' prince from the Rurik dynasty Rostislav Mikhailovich, son-in-law of the Hungarian king Béla IV, ruled this area in 1255-1264  years. It is known for sure that Serbian despots Stefan Lazarević and Đurađ Branković also ruled here. As an example of extremely unstable and turbulent times before the Turkish conquest, one can consider city of Srebrenica, which in 1411-1463 years changed the masters 13 times. 

A similar fate was shared by the most important medieval site in the Ugljevik area — the fortified town of Teočak. Teočak was first mentioned in historical sources around 1432 in connection with the Serbian despot Đurađ Branković (1427-1456), when he took it over from the Hungarians (when he received the right to rule over the western Podrinje) and made various additions and improvements to the fortress. It appears that at that time a small fortification grew into the fortified town of Teočak. The shape of the triangular base is reminiscent of Smederevo Fortress. Probably, the church in Teočak was also built then and later turned into a mosque, which still exists today. Relics of St. Evangelist Luke presumably has been here. After the fall of Bosnia in 1463, the Hungarians held Teočak until 1521, when it was occupied by the Turks together with Srebrenik (Srebrenica Banovina).

For a time, Teočak was even the capital of the newly proclaimed "Kingdom of Bosnia". It so happened that at one point both Turkey and Hungary were playing the card of the existence of the Bosnian state, so both states installed the so-called "kings of Bosnia". The Turks appointed Matija Vojsalić as the "King of Bosnia" and held him with that title until 1476, exactly the same year when the Christian army temporarily regained Srebrenica. Subsequently Hungary appointed the eminent Hungarian nobleman Nikola Iločki as the "King of Bosnia", who appeared as the Ban of Macva from 1438, and transferred him to the "capital" of Jajce in 1471. Shortly afterwards from 1472-1477 "King Nikola Iločki" was transferred to Teočak where he sat for five years, after which the title was revoked, and then the entire administration has left to the Srebrenica banovina. 

In the times of the Ottoman Empire, Teočak was part of the Završje Nahija. It lay west of Sapna and Teočak. Within, it had 2 princes of 2 principalities, The first prince was Maleš, son of Dragić. The Nahija was protected by Vlachs in the Vranić village along with Gornja Pribina, and Tušna Labučka. In this entire Principality there were 61 Christian homes with 110 tabis, 20 Muslim homes with 23 tabis.

See also
List of fortifications in Bosnia and Herzegovina

References

Books 

Castles in Bosnia and Herzegovina
National Monuments of Bosnia and Herzegovina